The Jizera Table is a plateau and a geomorphological mesoregion of the Czech Republic. It is located mostly in the Central Bohemian Region, northeast of Prague.

Geomorphology
The Jizera Table is a mesoregion of the Central Bohemian Table within the Bohemian Massif. It is a height-constant denudation plateau divided by erosion notches. The plateau is further subdivided into the microregions of Central Jizera Table and Lower Jizera Table.

The area is rich in low peaks.

Geography
The territory is approximately anchor-shaped.

The territory is mostly without watercourses. The only notable river is the Jizera, after which the plateau is named. It flows across the entire territory.

The most populated settlements entirely located in the territory are Benátky nad Jizerou, Bělá pod Bezdězem and Mšeno. Small parts of Mladá Boleslav, Mělník, Lysá nad Labem and Dobrovice also extends into the Jizera Table.

Vegetation
The landscape has predominantly an agricultural character and is relatively sparsely forested.

Gallery

References

Landforms of the Czech Republic
Geography of the Central Bohemian Region
Plateaus of Europe